Little Boy: The Arts of Japan's Exploding Subculture is the companion catalogue to the exhibition "Little Boy" curated by artist Takashi Murakami. The book is about the aesthetics of postwar culture in Japan.

The 448 pages hardcover book was published by Yale University in conjunction with a series of art exhibitions and music events in the Japan Society of New York in 2005. The book interprets the complex intuitive twist of postwar Japanese art while defining its high-spirited and naturally buoyant escape from human tragedy and the events of World War II. Takashi Murakami also coins the term superflat to chronicle the two-dimensional aspect of manga (comics) and anime (animated television and cinema). He argues how this international boom in pop media culture influenced Japanese fine art in relation to the social implications of superflat regarding the true impact of the atomic bombings of Hiroshima and Nagasaki in 1945 on Japanese art and culture. Little Boy is the code name for one of the atomic bombs that devastated Japan.

Little Boy also examines Kawaii (可愛さ kawaisa), the culture of cuteness which influenced Japan during the postmodernist era of the late 1900s; and the dissected pop-culture movement of Otaku. The book contains a collection of works including the first Godzilla, the anime Neon Genesis Evangelion, and the paintings of Chiho Aoshima.

Japan Society Exhibit
Little Boy is the companion volume for an art exhibition gallery presented at Japan Society in conjunction with the Public Art Fund between April 8 to July 24, 2005. The exhibition consisted of four public art projects that explored the phenomenon otaku, a subculture consisting of science fiction, manga and anime. Curated by Murakami, this exhibition also explored the culture of postwar Japan through the art and visual media from Hideaki Anno, Chiho Aoshima, Chinatsu Ban, Fujiko Fujio, Kawashima Hideaki, Mahomi Kunikata, Leiji Matsumoto, Miura Jun, Mr., Tarō Okamoto, Oshima Yuki, Katsuhiro Ōtomo, Otomo Shoji, Aya Takano, Tsubaki Noboru, Kenji Yanobe, Yoshitomo Nara and Takashi Murakami.

External links
 
 Little Boy: The Arts of Japan's Exploding Subculture, April 8 - July 24, 2005, Japan Society of New York

Art exhibitions in the United States
2005 books
Yale University Press books